The Roller Freestyle World Championships  is the premier roller freestyle championship organised by World Skate. The competition has been held annually biennially since 2017 as part of the World Skate Games.

Venues

Elite Medallists

Men's

Park

Street

Vert

Women

Park

Street

Vert

References

Recurring sporting events established in 2015
Roller freestyle